Anybody Here Seen Kelly? is a 1928 American silent comedy film directed by William Wyler. This was the first non-Western film to be directed by Wyler and is now considered to be a lost film. This is Bessie Love's final silent film. It was produced by Universal Pictures.

Production 
Location scenes were filmed in New York City.

The title of the film originates from the 1908 British music hall standard "Has Anybody Here Seen Kelly?" by C. W. Murphy and Will Letters. The song was popularized in the United States by singer Nora Bayes who sang it in the first ever Ziegfeld Follies.

Plot 
While serving in the American Army during World War I, Pat Kelly (Moore), a womanizing soldier tells all the girls he romances to come and visit him in New York City after the war. Never expecting any of them to take him up on it, he gives his address as the Metropolitan Museum of Art. However, one determined French girl, Mitzi Lavelle (Love), comes to America looking for him. Walking through the streets of New York, she eventually finds him working as a traffic police officer.

Cast

See also 
 List of lost films

References

External links 
 
 
 
 

1928 comedy films
1928 lost films
1928 films
American black-and-white films
Silent American comedy films
American silent feature films
Films directed by William Wyler
Films set in New York City
Films shot in New York City
Lost American films
Universal Pictures films
Lost comedy films
1920s American films